Garra bisangulris is a fish species in the genus Garra endemic to the Mekong River basin in China.

References

Cyprinid fish of Asia
Fish described in 2010
Garra